"If You Lose Her" is a song by American R&B singer Joe. It was written by Joe, Alvin Garrett, Derek "D.O.A." Allen, and Gerald Isaac for his eleventh studio album Bridges (2014), while production was helmed by Isaac and Allen. Released as the album's second single, it peaked at number six on the US Billboard Adult R&B Songs.

Charts

References

2015 singles
2014 songs
Joe (singer) songs
Songs written by Joe (singer)